The Embassy of the United Kingdom in Oslo is the chief diplomatic mission of the United Kingdom in Norway. The Embassy is located on one of the most expensive streets in Norway, Thomas Heftyes gate, in the Frogner district. The current British Ambassador to Norway is Richard Wood.

Ambassador's residence
The British Ambassador's residence in Oslo, Villa Frognæs, is located at Drammensveien 79. Built in 1859, it was designed by Norwegian architects Heinrich Ernst Schirmer and Christian Heinrich Grosch and purchased by the British government in 1906.

See also
Norway–United Kingdom relations
List of diplomatic missions in Norway
List of diplomats of the United Kingdom to Norway

References

Oslo
United Kingdom
Buildings and structures in Oslo
Norway–United Kingdom relations